Rebecca Nagle is an American activist, writer and public speaker. She is a citizen of the Cherokee Nation. Nagle is one of the founders of FORCE: Upsetting Rape Culture, an organization led by artists and activists who attempt to promote a culture of consent. Nagle was also a coordinator of the event "PINK Loves CONSENT."

Career
In 2012, Rebecca Nagle and Hannah Brancato created a website called "Pink Loves Consent" which coincided with the Victoria's Secret fashion show. The website is meant to look like the Victoria's Secret website and features underwear with anti-rape slogans like "Consent is Sexy", "No Means No", and "Ask First". Nothing on the website was for sale, instead the website provided information about rape education.   On December 4, 2012, lawyers from Victoria's Secret forced the website to be taken down. They claimed that the website caused confusion among their customers.

As a part of Nagle's project to create a national monument for sexual assault survivors, FORCE: Upsetting Rape Culture released a giant floating poem in the Reflecting Pool in front of the Washington National Monument. The floating poem read: "I Can't Forget What Happened But No One Else Remembers." With Force co-founder Hannah Brancato, Nagle created The Monument Quilt to establish “a public healing space by and for survivors of rape and abuse”. Over 1700 sexual assault survivors have contributed segments to this quilt.

In 2019, Nagle hosted the podcast This Land produced by Crooked Media, which was nominated for Peabody Award in 2021. The podcast focused on the case of Carpenter v. Murphy, a pending Supreme Court case to determine the land rights of various indigenous groups in Oklahoma. 

Nagle has been critical of Massachusetts Democratic senator Elizabeth Warren's claims of Cherokee ancestry, emphasizing that "[t]ribal affiliation and kinship determine Cherokee identity — not race or biology." She has spoken out about the issue in numerous print, television, and online media outlets.

Recognition 
In 2012 and 2013, Nagle was named one of Fast Company's 100 Most Creative People. Nagle was also named one of the National Center of American Indian Enterprise Development's 2016 Native American 40 Under 40. Nagle was named the 2016 Sondheim Art Prize recipient, and she was listed on the Yerba Buena Center for the Arts 2015 100 List for innovators and thought leaders. Nagle won the 2020 American Mosaic Journalism Prize for work on the podcast This Land and the Washington Post article “Half the land in Oklahoma could be returned to Native Americans. It should be.”.

Personal life 
Nagle lives in Tahlequah, Oklahoma. Nagle identifies as a two spirit woman and is an enrolled citizen of the Cherokee Nation. She is a survivor of child sexual abuse. Nagle is directly descended from 19th century Cherokee leaders Major Ridge and John Ridge, who signed the Treaty of New Echota, which caused the Trail of Tears for the Cherokee people. She uses this ancestry to highlight points in parts of her This Land podcast.

References 

Living people
Cherokee Nation writers
American LGBT rights activists
Native American activists
Oklahoma Democrats
LGBT Native Americans
Two-spirit people
Year of birth missing (living people)
Crooked Media
21st-century American writers
21st-century American women writers
21st-century Native Americans
21st-century Native American women
Writers from Oklahoma
Activists from Oklahoma
People from Tahlequah, Oklahoma